Patrick John Gavin (born 5 June 1967) is a retired English footballer.  He played as a striker for several clubs, with probably his most successful spell coming at Gillingham.

Career
Gavin started out playing for non-league Hanwell Town whilst working as a postman (earning him the nickname "Postman Pat") before he was signed on a short-term contract by Third Division Gillingham towards the end of the 1988-89 season.  This was the first transfer deal for which Hanwell had ever received a fee. He scored seven goals in just thirteen games, although this was not enough to save the Gills from relegation.  Impressed with his ability, Gillingham moved quickly to sign him to a permanent contract, however due to an oversight the contract was not correctly registered with the Football League.  As this left Gavin technically out of contract, First Division club Leicester City were able to sign him up.  After protracted wranglings, Leicester agreed to allow him to return to Gillingham on loan for the 1989-90 season but the controversy affected his form and he scored just one goal in over thirty matches.

Upon his return to Leicester he was unable to secure a first-team place and moved on to Peterborough United.  He later played for Northampton Town and Wigan Athletic before drifting into non-league football, starting with two seasons at Farnborough Town.  During his time with Northampton Town, he scored two goals against Shrewsbury Town on the last day of the 1992-93 season which left Northampton as 3-2 winners, thus preserving their league status.

In 2005 Gavin returned to the club where he had started his career, Hanwell Town, initially as player-coach.  In January 2006 he stepped up to the role of joint manager, but his tenure ended in February 2007.

References

Sources

Pat Gavin career stats

1967 births
Living people
Gillingham F.C. players
Leicester City F.C. players
Peterborough United F.C. players
Northampton Town F.C. players
Wigan Athletic F.C. players
Aylesbury United F.C. players
Chelmsford City F.C. players
Harrow Borough F.C. players
Hendon F.C. players
Footballers from Hammersmith
Association football forwards
English footballers
English football managers
Association football coaches